Warrior Mountain is located on the border of Alberta and British Columbia on the Continental Divide. It was named in 1917 after HMS Warrior.
The first ascent of the mountain was made in 1930 by Kate (Katie) Gardiner and Walter Feuz. The duo also made the first ascents of nearby Mount Sarrail and Mount Lyautey that same year.

Geology

Warrior Mountain is composed of sedimentary rock laid down during the Precambrian to Jurassic periods. Formed in shallow seas, this sedimentary rock was pushed east and over the top of younger rock during the Laramide orogeny.

Climate

Based on the Köppen climate classification, the mountain is located in a subarctic climate zone with cold, snowy winters, and mild summers. Temperatures can drop below −20° C with wind chill factors below −30° C.

See also
 List of peaks on the Alberta–British Columbia border
 Mountains of Alberta
 Mountains of British Columbia

References

Warrior Mountain
Warrior Mountain
Canadian Rockies